Glaucocharis aeolocnemis is a moth in the family Crambidae. It was described by Edward Meyrick in 1931. It is found on Tagula Island in Papua New Guinea's Louisiade Archipelago.

References

Diptychophorini
Moths described in 1931